Tomas Norvoll (born 12 February 1972 in Vardø) is a Norwegian politician for the Labour Party.

He was elected to the Norwegian Parliament from Nordland in 1993, at only 21 years of age and was re-elected on one occasion. He later served in the position of deputy representative during the term 2001–2005.

Since 2013 he has been serving as the govenour of Nordland.

References

1972 births
Living people
People from Vardø
Labour Party (Norway) politicians
Members of the Storting
21st-century Norwegian politicians
20th-century Norwegian politicians